A restaurateur is a person who opens and runs restaurants professionally. Although over time the term has come to describe any person who owns a restaurant, traditionally it refers to a highly skilled professional who is proficient in all aspects of the restaurant business.

Etymology
The French word  comes from the Late Latin term  ("restorer") and from the Latin term restaurare. The word restaurateur is simply French for a person who owns or runs a restaurant. The feminine form of the French noun is restauratrice.

A less common variant spelling restauranteur is formed from the "more familiar" term restaurant with the French suffix -eur borrowed from restaurateur. It is considered a misspelling by some. The Oxford English Dictionary gives examples of this variant (described as "originally American") going back to 1837. H. L. Mencken said that in using this form he was using an American, not a French, word.

See also

 Culinary arts
 Foodservice
 List of restaurateurs
 National Restaurant Association
 Restaurant
 Restaurant management
 The World's 50 Best Restaurants

References

External links

 
Food services occupations